These are some of the more notable alumni, attendees and faculty of Towson University, a public university located in Towson in Baltimore County, Maryland, United States, and its predecessor institutions.

Arts and entertainment

John Auville, co-host of The Sports Junkies on WJFK, 106.7
Jeff Bakalar, CBS Interactive podcast host and on-air personality
Brandon Broady, host of BET's The Xperiment
Jack Dunlop, a streamer and esports caster
Charles S. Dutton, actor
Charla Baklayan Faddoul and Mirna Hindoyan, contestants on the fifth and eleventh (all-star version) editions on the multiple-Emmy Award-winning game show The Amazing Race
John Ferber, founder, Advertising.com and ABC's  Secret Millionaire
Mike Flanagan, filmmaker (The Haunting of Hill House, Doctor Sleep, Gerald's Game, Hush, Before I Wake, Oculus, Absentia)
Brad Freitas, Emmy Award-winning Reporter/Photojournalist for NBCWashington 
Mike Gazzo, producer/songwriter 
John Glover, Smallville star; graduated and received an honorary master's degree; frequently visits the theater department to work with students; recognized as a Distinguished Alumnus in May 2008
Andy Karl, Broadway actor, best known for his Tony-nominated performance in Rocky the Musical
John Kassir, film, stage and TV actor and producer, comedian, voice actor. Star Search winner 1985, The Three Stooges bio pic, Reefer Madness the Musical, Johnnytime on USA TV.
Stacy Keibler, actress, dancer, model, former Baltimore Ravens cheerleader and former WWE wrestler, was part of Towson's Mass Communications department; her graduation is uncertain
Chris LaMartina, director, producer, and writer
Brad Mays, filmmaker (The Watermelon, SING*ularity, The Bacchae); former Baltimore, New York and Los Angeles stage director
Ross Rawlings, pianist, composer, conductor, and music director
Mike Riley, cartoonist, graduated with a BA in Fine Arts
Howard Rollins, Academy Award-nominated actor known for his portrayal of Coalhouse Walker, Jr. in the film Ragtime, and as Virgil Tibbs on the NBC/CBS television series In the Heat of the Night
Mike Rowe, Discovery Channel's Dirty Jobs host
Gerry Sandusky, sportscaster for WBAL-TV Channel 11 in Baltimore; son of Baltimore Colts' John Sandusky
Dwight Schultz, TV actor, played Capt. "Howling Mad" Murdock on The A-Team and Lieutenant Reginald Barclay in Star Trek: The Next Generation; graduated with a BA in Arts
Amy Schumer, comedian, actress, and contestant on Last Comic Standing
Drew Van Acker, actor, plays Jason DiLaurentis on Pretty Little Liars

Sports

Jermon Bushrod, NFL player drafted by the New Orleans Saints (#125th pick) in 2007 draft; currently plays for the New Orleans Saints
Kacy Catanzaro, professional wrestler and first woman to complete the qualifying course of American Ninja Warrior
Dan Crowley, former CFL player for multiple teams; currently a staff member of the Towson Athletic Department
Ryan Delaire, NFL player, San Francisco 49ers
Jordan Dangerfield (born 1990), NFL player, Pittsburgh Steelers
Kyle Fiat, professional lacrosse player, Philadelphia Wings 
Tamir Goodman, professional basketball player once known as the "Jewish Jordan" 
Justin Gorham (born 1998), basketball player in the Israeli Basketball Premier League
Sean Landeta, former NFL player for the New York Giants
 Ryan Lexer (born 1976), American-Israeli basketball player
Mike Locksley, Maryland Terrapins football Head Coach, 2012 
Matt Lilly, Delaware Blue Coats general manager
Dave Meggett, former NFL player for the New York Giants and New England Patriots
Machel Millwood, forward, Baltimore Blast 
Gary Neal, NBA player, Washington Wizards
John Schuerholz, Atlanta Braves President; frequent donor to the university; namesake of Towson's baseball park (John B. Schuerholz Baseball Complex)
Chad Scott, former NFL player, New England Patriots
Gerrard Sheppard, CFL player, Winnipeg Blue Bombers
Tye Smith, NFL player, Tennessee Titans
Joe Vitt, Assistant Head Coach for the Miami Dolphins 
Terrance West, running back for the Baltimore Ravens 
Casper Wells, MLB player, Chicago Cubs
Madieu Williams, NFL player, Washington Redskins; transferred from Towson to finish college career at University of Maryland, College Park
Bruce Zimmermann, pitcher for the Baltimore Orioles

Music

Cecylia Barczyk, cellist
John Christ, guitar player for Danzig, dropped out in 1987
Ellery Eskelin, jazz saxophonist, internationally recognized touring and recording artist
Kyle Hollingsworth, keyboardist for The String Cheese Incident
Joe Nice, dubstep DJ
Dave East, hip-hop artist
YBN Cordae, hip-hop artist, dropped out in 2018

Writers

Jack L. Chalker, author of over 50 science fiction novels; graduated in 1966; awarded as a Distinguished Alumni, College of Liberal Arts, April 2003
Ronald Malfi, novelist, graduated in 1999
Brian Stelter, CNN
W. Wesley McDonald, author of Russell Kirk and the Age of Ideology and former professor at Elizabethtown College

Politics and government

Judiciary of Maryland

Mary Ellen Barbera (1975), Chief Judge, Court of Appeals of Maryland, 2013–present
Katie O'Malley (1985), Associate Judge, District Court for Baltimore City, Maryland, wife of former Maryland Governor and former Baltimore Mayor, Martin O'Malley

State delegates

Charles E. Barkley (1972), member of the Maryland House of Delegates, 1999–present
John L. Bohanan, Jr. (1981), member of the Maryland House of Delegates, 1999–2015
Michael W. Burns (1980), former member of the Maryland House of Delegates, 1995–99
Ann Marie Doory (1976), former member of the Maryland House of Delegates, 1987–2010
Tawanna P. Gaines (1981), member of the Maryland House of Delegates, 2001–present
Jolene Ivey (1982), member of the Maryland House of Delegates, 2007–present
Melissa J. Kelly (1987), former member of the Maryland House of Delegates, 2001–02
Susan W. Krebs (1981), member of the Maryland House of Delegates, 2003–present
Stephen W. Lafferty (1977), member of Maryland House of Delegates, 2007–present
Christian Miele (2004, 2008), former member of the Maryland House of Delegates, 2015–2019
Warren E. Miller (1987), member of the Maryland House of Delegates, 2003–present
Nathaniel T. Oaks, former member of the Maryland House of Delegates, 1983–89, and 1995–2018
B. Daniel Riley (1978), former member of the Maryland House of Delegates, 1999–2003, and 2007–11
Tanya Thornton Shewell (1970), former member of the Maryland House of Delegates, 2004–11
Kathy Szeliga (1994), member of the Maryland House of Delegates, 2011–present
Pat Young (2010), member of the Maryland House of Delegates, 2015–present

State Senate

Michael J. Hough (2007), member of the Maryland Senate, 2015–present, former member of the Maryland House of Delegates, 2011–2014
Katherine Klausmeier, member of the Maryland Senate, 2003–present
Karen S. Montgomery, former member of the Maryland Senate, 2010–2016
Sarah K. Elfreth, member of the Maryland State Senate, 2019–present
Pamela Beidle (1994), former member of the Maryland House of Delegates, 2007–present, member of the Maryland Senate, 2019–

County executives

Calvin B. Ball, III (1997), member of the Howard County Council, 2006–2018, Howard County executive 2018–present
David R. Craig (1971), former member of the Maryland Senate, 1995–99, former Harford County Executive, 2005–2014, former Maryland Secretary of Planning 2015-2016

Local government

Sheila A. Dixon (1976), former president of the Baltimore City Council, 1999–2007, former Mayor of Baltimore, 2007–2010
James B. Kraft (1971), former member of the Maryland Senate, 2002–03, member of the Baltimore City Council, 2004–present
A. Wade Kach, former member of the Maryland House of Delegates, 1975–2014, member of the Baltimore County Council, 2014–present

Faculty

Tony Campbell, political science professor and US Senate candidate, 2018
Phyllis Chinn, mathematics professor 
Beth Haller, journalism professor, Fulbright scholar
Donald Minnegan, former coach of the school's championship soccer teams; namesake of the school's mascot, Doc
Johnny Unitas, former quarterback for the Baltimore Colts; Towson Athletics' community liaison; raised funds for the school's athletic programs

Religion
 Joseph Maskell (1939–2001), Catholic priest accused of sexual abuse

References

See also
List of Towson alumni

Towson University people
Towson University